Banane (I Don't Care) is the third studio album by Turkish singer Demet Akalın. It was released on 12 December 2004. Suat Aydoğan served as the album's music director. The songs were arranged by Ersay Üner, Erdem Kınay and Lütfü Bayülgen. The album sold 40,000 copies in 19 days. Eight music videos were made for the songs "Bittim", "Aşkın Açamadığı Kapı", "Banane", "Vuracak", "Bir Anda Sevmiştim", "Tamamdır", "Pembe Dizi" and "Adam Gibi", the second of which was chosen as the Song of the Year at the 12th Turkey Music Awards. Critics drew similarities between "Banane"'s music vido and Madonna's short film "Star" made in 2002 for BMW.

Track listing

Release history

References 

Demet Akalın albums
2004 albums